Norma Dumont Viana Ferreira (born October 1, 1990) is a Brazilian mixed martial artist in the Featherweight division who fights in the Ultimate Fighting Championship. As of October 3, 2022, she is #13 in the UFC women's bantamweight rankings.

Background
Dumont's father abandoned her mother and his three daughters when Dumont was 4. At 13, Dumont started practicing Jiu Jitsu. She stopped training to begin work as a secretary. At 19 years old, she went back to training and continued with her MMA career. During this time, she became a six-time Sanda State champion and National champion of Sanda.

When Dumont returned to training at 19, she found a free Muay Thai class. She was suggested by a friend to try Sanda and upon seeing it for the first time signed up immediately.

Mixed martial arts career

Early career
Starting her career in 2016, Dumont compiled a perfect 4–0 record on the regional Brazilian scene, winning two of those bouts via first round submission.

Ultimate Fighting Championship 
Dumont made her promotional debut on February 29, 2020 at UFC Fight Night 169 against Megan Anderson. She lost the fight via knockout in round one.

She made her sophomore appearance in the organization against Ashlee Evans-Smith on November 28, 2020 at UFC on ESPN: Smith vs. Clark. At the weigh-ins, Norma Dumont weighed in at 139.5 pounds, three and a half pounds over the women's bantamweight non-title fight limit. Her bout proceeded at catchweight and she was fined 30% of her individual purse, which went to her opponent. She won the fight via unanimous decision.

Dumont was expected to face Bea Malecki at UFC on ABC: Vettori vs. Holland on April 10, 2021. However, Malecki pulled out a week before the contest due to undisclosed reasons and was replaced by promotional newcomer Erin Blanchfield. In turn, the bout was pulled from the card by after Dumont missed weight by 3.5lbs.

Dumont, as a replacement for Danyelle Wolf, faced Felicia Spencer on May 22, 2021 at UFC Fight Night: Font vs. Garbrandt. She won the bout via split decision.

Dumont was scheduled to face Holly Holm on October 16, 2021 at UFC Fight Night 195. However, on October 6, 2021 it was reported that Holm was forced to withdraw from the event, citing injury, and was replaced by Aspen Ladd. Dumont was not concerned with the short notice nature of the fight saying, "I've been training five rounds and doing 25 minutes straight. That's nothing new to me." Dumont won the fight via unanimous decision.

Dumont faced Macy Chiasson on May 7, 2022 at UFC 274. At the weigh-ins, Dumont weighed in at 146.5 pounds, half a pound over the women's featherweight non-title fight limit. The bout proceeded at catchweight, with Dumont forfeiting 30% of her purse to Chiasson. Dumont lost the fight via split decision.

Dumont faced promotional newcomer Danyelle Wolf on September 10, 2022, at UFC 279. She won the fight via unanimous decision.

Dumont is scheduled to face Karol Rosa April 22, 2023 at UFC Fight Night 222.

Mixed martial arts record

|Win
|align=center|8–2
|Danyelle Wolf
|Decision (unanimous)
|UFC 279
|
|align=center|3
|align=center|5:00
|Las Vegas, Nevada, United States
|
|-
|Loss
|align=center|7–2
|Macy Chiasson
|Decision (split)
|UFC 274
|
|align=center|3
|align=center|5:00
|Phoenix, Arizona, United States
|
|-
|Win
|align=center|7–1
|Aspen Ladd
|Decision (unanimous)
|UFC Fight Night: Ladd vs. Dumont
|
|align=center|5
|align=center|5:00
|Las Vegas, Nevada, United States
|
|-
|Win
|align=center|6–1
|Felicia Spencer
|Decision (split)
|UFC Fight Night: Font vs. Garbrandt
|
|align=center|3
|align=center|5:00
|Las Vegas, Nevada, United States
|
|-
| Win
| align=center|5–1
| Ashlee Evans-Smith
| Decision (unanimous)
| UFC on ESPN: Smith vs. Clark
| 
| align=center|3
| align=center|5:00
| Las Vegas, Nevada, United States
| 
|-
| Loss
| align=center|4–1
| Megan Anderson
| KO (punch)
| UFC Fight Night: Benavidez vs. Figueiredo 
| 
| align=center|1
| align=center|3:31
| Norfolk, Virginia, United States
| 
|-
| Win
| align=center| 4–0
| Mariana Morais
| Decision (majority)
| Shooto Brazil 86
| 
| align=center| 3
| align=center| 5:00
| Rio de Janeiro, Brazil
| 
|-
| Win
| align=center| 3–0
| Erica Leidianny Ribeiro
| Submission (rear-naked choke)
| Federação Fight 5
| 
| align=center| 1
| align=center| 3:43
| Belo Horizonte, Brazil
| 
|-
| Win
| align=center| 2–0
| Patricia Borges Fernandes
| Decision (unanimous)
| Jungle Fight 91
| 
| align=center| 3
| align=center| 5:00
| Contagem, Brazil
| 
|-
| Win
| align=center| 1–0
| Tainara Lisboa
| Submission (rear-naked choke)
| Jungle Fight 90
| 
| align=center| 1
| align=center| 2:58
| São Paulo, Brazil
|
|-

See also 
 List of current UFC fighters
 List of female mixed martial artists

References

External links
 
 

1990 births
Living people
Brazilian practitioners of Brazilian jiu-jitsu
Female Brazilian jiu-jitsu practitioners
Brazilian Sanshou practitioners
Brazilian female mixed martial artists
Bantamweight mixed martial artists
Mixed martial artists utilizing sanshou
Mixed martial artists utilizing Brazilian jiu-jitsu
Ultimate Fighting Championship female fighters
Sportspeople from Belo Horizonte